is a Japanese association football manga series written and illustrated by Motoyuki Tanaka. It was serialized in Shogakukan's Weekly Shōnen Sunday from January 2011 to October 2022, with its chapters collected into 49 tankōbon volumes.

In 2015, Be Blues! won the 60th Shogakukan Manga Award in the shōnen category.

Plot
Ryū Ichijō is a prodigy football player who dreams of becoming a professional player and member of the Japan national team (the "Blues" of the title) by the age of 18. He excels as he proceeds through his schooling, but just as he prepares to start his junior high school he suffers a fall leading to really serious injuries, and has to go through a long period of rehabilitation. Two years after his accident, he is able to play again and starts working to get his skills up again, and to improve so as to achieve his dreams of making it to the national team.

Characters

Publication
Be Blues! – Ao ni Nare, written and illustrated by Motoyuki Tanaka, was serialized for eleven years in Shogakukan's shōnen manga magazine Weekly Shōnen Sunday from January 26, 2011, to October 12, 2022. Shogakukan collected its chapters in forty-nine tankōbon volumes, released from June 17, 2011, to November 18, 2022.

Volume list

Reception
Be Blues! won the 60th Shogakukan Manga Award in the shōnen category in 2015.

See also
Saikyō! Toritsu Aoizaka Kōkō Yakyūbu, another manga series by the same author

References

External links
 

Association football in anime and manga
Shogakukan manga
Shōnen manga
Winners of the Shogakukan Manga Award for shōnen manga